The 2017–18 Campbell Fighting Camels basketball team represented Campbell University during the 2017–18 NCAA Division I men's basketball season. The Fighting Camels were led by fifth-year head coach Kevin McGeehan and played their home games at Gore Arena in Buies Creek, North Carolina as members of the Big South Conference. They finished the season 18–16, 10–8 in Big South play to finish in fourth place. They lost to Liberty in the quarterfinals of the Big South tournament. They were invited to the College Basketball Invitational where they defeated Miami (OH) and New Orleans before losing in the semifinals to San Francisco.

Previous season
The  Fighting Camels finished the season 19–18, 7–11 in Big South play to finish in a tie for seventh place. Due to tiebreakers, they received the No. 7 seed in the Big South tournament where defeated Presbyterian, UNC Asheville, and Radford to advance to the championship game where they lost to Winthrop. They received an invitation to the CollegeInsider.com Tournament where they defeated Houston Baptist and UT Martin before losing in the quarterfinals to Furman.

Roster

Schedule and results

|-
!colspan=9 style=| Non-conference regular season

|-
!colspan=9 style=| Big South regular season

|-
!colspan=9 style=| Big South tournament

|-
!colspan=9 style=| CBI

References

Campbell Fighting Camels basketball seasons
Campbell
Campbell
Camp
Camp